"Wasabi" is a song written by Adrian Hannan, Barbara Hannan, Emma Graham and Tommy Rando, produced by Adrian Hannan for Australian singer Lee Harding's debut album, What's Wrong with This Picture? (2006). Harding was a contestant on season three of Australian Idol (July–November 2005).

Harding's debut single was issued on 12 December 2005 as a double A-side with his cover version of Survivor's "Eye of the Tiger". It peaked at  1 on the Australian ARIA Singles Chart for five consecutive weeks. In 2009, a Herald Sun poll ranked "Wasabi" as the sixth-worst Australian song of all time.

Track listing
CD single
 "Wasabi" – 3:03
 "Eye of the Tiger" – 2:45

Charts

Weekly charts

Year-end charts

Certification

See also
 Australian Idol
 Music of Australia
 List of number-one singles of 2005 (Australia)
 List of number-one singles of 2006 (Australia)

References

2005 singles
2005 songs
Number-one singles in Australia